Phitsanulok Airport  is an airport serving Phitsanulok, a city in the Phitsanulok Province of Thailand.  The airport is south of the city's downtown area.

Airlines and destinations

Miscellaneous 
To the right and to the left of the tarmac are two decommissioned Boeing 747 jets from Orient Thai Airlines. The airline ceased operations and filed for bankruptcy in October 2018.

References

External links

 Phitsanulok Airport, Dept of Civil Aviation
 
 

Airports in Thailand
Buildings and structures in Phitsanulok province
Airports established in 1941